Noël Bernard (born 'Noel Bercovici'; 25 February 1925 – 23 December 1981) was a Romanian journalist, known for being the head of the Romanian-language department of Radio Free Europe (RFE). His mysterious death is believed by some to have been caused by Communist Romania's secret police, the Securitate, which is known to have previously sought his neutralisation.

Biography
Born in Bucharest, to a Jewish father and a German Evangelical mother, Noël Bernard left Romania together with his parents, and moved to Mandatory Palestine in 1940. There, he studied mathematics at Hebrew University of Jerusalem where he met his first wife, fellow student Yvette Bourla. He then moved to London, where he changed his name to Bernard and became a journalist at the BBC, working in the organisation's Romanian service.

Bernard started working as the chief of the Romanian language department of the West German-based Radio Free Europe in 1953, but he left in 1958 and moved to Rome with his wife and two children. After reporting from Rome, he and his family returned to England, where Bernard ran the London office of Radio Press International (RPI), a radio news service that was ultimately bought out by UPI. Eight years after leaving Munich, Bernard returned to serve as director of RFE's Romanian-language department until his death in 1981. In 1972, he married Ioana Măgură. A former newsreader for the Romanian Radio and Television (1964–1969), she had defected from Communist Romania in 1969, and had started working for RFE in Munich.

Under his leadership, the Romanian-language department of Radio Free Europe became the most popular of all the languages it broadcast. After the 1977 Bucharest earthquake, Bernard obtained permission from the radio board to transmit around-the-clock information in Romanian. According to Arch Puddington in Broadcasting Freedom. The Cold War Triumph of Radio Free Europe and Radio Liberty, under Bernard's leadership "the Romanian section carried out a relentless polemical offensive against Ceaușescu [...] The tone was biting, personal and sarcastic. During Bernard's editorship, the Romanian section was not infrequently cited for violation of the station's strictures against vituperation and rhetorical excess."

The Securitate tried to start disputes within the Romanian-language department of RFE and to create a hostile environment against Bernard, to remove him from the head of the radio station.

Ion Mihai Pacepa, the Romanian intelligence general who defected to the United States, claimed that he decided to defect after Communist President Nicolae Ceaușescu ordered him to assassinate Bernard. In his book, Red Horizons, Pacepa claimed that Bernard was Ceaușescu's bête noire because of his strong criticism of Ceaușescu's personality cult.

Bernard died of cancer. His wife, Ioana Măgură-Bernard, moved to California, to join her daughter and grandchildren. In various statements for the Romanian press, she suggests that her late husband was irradiated by the Securitate, which had previously infiltrated the RFE's structure. She also linked Bernard's death to those of RFE journalists such as Cornel Chiriac (who was stabbed to death in mysterious circumstances), Emil Georgescu and Vlad Georgescu (both of whom, like Bernard and others in quick succession, died of cancer). This hypothesis appears to be supported by his Securitate file, which has attached an article from a magazine which talks about him undergoing surgery and has a note which argues that the article confirms "the measures undertaken by us are starting to have an effect". (See also: Radu (weapon).)

References

Further reading
 Ioana Măgură Bernard, Directorul postului nostru de radio, Editura Curtea Veche, 2007. 

1925 births
1981 deaths
Journalists from Bucharest
Romanian Jews
Romanian emigrants to Mandatory Palestine
Romanian expatriates in West Germany
BBC newsreaders and journalists
Radio Free Europe/Radio Liberty people
Romanian anti-communists
20th-century journalists
Romanian people of German descent
Romanian people of Jewish descent